KUNA-LD (channel 15) is a low-power television station licensed to Indio, California, United States, serving the Coachella Valley as an affiliate of the Spanish-language Telemundo network. It is owned by the News-Press & Gazette Company alongside Palm Springs–licensed ABC affiliate KESQ-TV (channel 42), Cathedral City–licensed Class A CBS affiliate KPSP-CD (channel 38), Class A Fox affiliate KDFX-CD (channel 33.2, licensed to both Indio and Palm Springs), and Palm Springs–licensed CW affiliate KCWQ-LD (channel 2). The stations share studios on Dunham Way in Thousand Palms, while KUNA-LD's transmitter is located in the Indio Hills.

In addition to its own digital signal, the station is simulcast in high definition on KPSP's second digital subchannel, and in standard definition on KESQ's eighth digital subchannel. Both KPSP and KESQ transmit from Edom Hill northeast of Cathedral City and I-10.

History

KUNA-LD signed on the air originally as K15EI on May 15, 1996, and then switched call letters to KUNA-LP on March 31, 2003. The station filed a license to cover application for digital operations on December 14, 2021. The digital license was issued on February 4, 2022, with the station changing its call sign to KUNA-LD.

Subchannel

See also
 KESQ-TV
 KDFX-CD

References

External links
Official website

Telemundo network affiliates
UNA-LD
Indio, California
News-Press & Gazette Company
Television channels and stations established in 1996
1996 establishments in California
UNA-LD
Low-power television stations in the United States